Granville Penn (9 December 1761 – 28 September 1844) was a great-grandson of Admiral Sir William Penn, a British author, and scriptural geologist.

Biography
He was born 9 December 1761 in Spring Gardens, London, the second surviving son of Thomas Penn and his wife, Lady Juliana Fermor Penn, fourth daughter of Thomas, first Earl of Pomfret. He studied at Magdalen College, Oxford, but did not complete his degree. He then became an assistant clerk in the war department.

In the period from 1788 Penn played a part in the development of veterinary education. A supporter of the Odiham Society, he met Charles Benoît Vial de Sainbel who was in England for the second time to try to set up a veterinary school, such as existed at Lyon; and whose profile was raised when he was asked to dissect the famous racehorse Eclipse. Penn ran a successful campaign over a few years to implement his own version of Sainbel's original scheme. The Veterinary College, London opened its doors to pupils at the beginning of 1792.

In 1834 Penn succeeded his brother, John Penn, in the estates of Stoke Park, Stoke Poges, Buckinghamshire, and Pennsylvania Castle, Portland. In 1836, he was elected as a member to the American Philosophical Society.

He died at Stoke Park, Buckinghamshire, on 28 September 1844. In 1791 he had married Isabella, the eldest daughter of General Gordon Forbes at All Saints Church, Kingston upon Thames; they had four sons and five daughters.

Writings
Penn, fluent in French, Greek, Latin and Hebrew, was a Fellow of the Society of Antiquaries and wrote several books dealing with Biblical criticism and published a number of competent translations of ancient Greek works, including a critical revision of the English version of the New Testament. He also wrote some theological works particularly related to Biblical chronology (past and future) and the early history of post-Flood mankind. In 1833 he wrote the Life of Admiral Sir William Penn, on his great-grandfather.

A Comparative Estimate
His major work as a scriptural geologist was A Comparative Estimate of the Mineral and Mosaical Geologies, published in 1822.  Penn added a supplement in 1823 in response to Buckland's theory on Kirkdale Cave, and then revised and enlarged it to two volumes in 1825 in response to criticisms. Like most Scriptural geologists, Penn, whose name became indelibly associated with Scriptural geology, participated only transiently with it during his career.  For example, between the production of his book when he was 62 and his death in 1844 he focused on philological scholarship.

Attitude toward geology
Penn wrote that "The science of Geology … has this remarkable character above all the preceding physical sciences; that, it not only conducts the intelligence, like them, to the discernment of the God of Nature, but advances it further, to a distinct recognition of that God of Nature in the God of Scripture."

Works
Critical Remarks on Isaiah vii. 18, 1799.
Remarks on the Eastern Origination of Mankind and of the Arts of Cultivated Life, 1799.
A Greek Version of the Inscription on the Rosetta Stone, containing a decree of the priests in honor of Ptolemy the Fifth, 1802.
The Bioscope. Or Dial of Life, explained. To which is added, a Translation of St.Paulinu's Epistle to Celantia, on the Rule of Christian Life; and an Elementary View of General Chronology, 1814.
 A Comparative Estimate of the Mineral and Mosaical Geologies, 1822
Life of Admiral Sir William Penn, 1833
"The Book of the New Covenant". A review and new translation, 1836

Notes

References

English geologists
English people of Welsh descent
1761 births
1844 deaths
Granville
Fellows of the Society of Antiquaries of London